

Ladder

Ladder progress

Regular season

Knockout phase

Semi-finals
The top four teams from the group stage qualified for the semi finals.

Final

2015/16 squad
Players with international caps are listed in bold.

Home attendance

References

External links
 Official website of the Sydney Thunder
 Official website of the Big Bash League

Sydney Thunder seasons